Rasikpur is a census town in Dumka CD block in Dumka subdivision of Dumka district in the Indian state of Jharkhand.

Geography

Location

Overview
The map shows a large area, which is a plateau with low hills, except in the eastern portion where the Rajmahal hills intrude into this area and the Ramgarh hills are there. The south-western portion is just a rolling upland. The entire area is overwhelmingly rural with only small pockets of urbanisation.

Note: The full screen map is interesting. All places marked on the map are linked in the full screen map and one can easily move on to another page of his/her choice. Enlarge the full screen map to see what else is there – one gets railway connections, many more road connections and so on.

Area
Rasikpur has an area of 1.62 km2.

Demographics
According to the 2011 Census of India, Rasikpur had a total population of 8,320, of which 4,257 (51%) were males and 4,063 (49%) were females. Population in the age range 0–6 years was 1,246.

Infrastructure
According to the District Census Handbook 2011, Dumka, Rasikpur covered an area of 1.62 km2. Among the civic amenities, it had 8 km roads with both open and closed drains, the protected water supply involved uncovered well, hand pump. It had 1,185 domestic electric connections, 10 road lighting points. Among the educational facilities it had 6 primary schools, 1 middle school, 1 secondary school. Among the social, cultural and recreational facilities it had x working women’s hostels. An important item it produced was furniture. It had the branch offices of 1 nationalised bank.

Transport
Dumka railway station,  on the Jasidih-Dumka-Rampurhat line, is located nearby.

Education
Government Middle School Rasikpur is a Hindi-medium coeducational institution stablished in 1925. It has facilities for teaching from class I to class VIII.

St. Xavier’s is an English-medium school in Rasikpur.

References

Cities and towns in Dumka district